St. Mary's Church of the Immaculate Conception Complex is an historic Roman Catholic church complex at 103 Pine Street in Pawtucket, Rhode Island.

Description
It is home to the oldest Catholic parish in Pawtucket, and the second-oldest in the Roman Catholic Diocese of Providence, which encompasses the entire state. The parish was established in 1830. The only surviving element from its early years is the cemetery. The present church, a red brick structure with Gothic Revival styling,  was built in 1885–87. Also in the complex is the rectory, a -story Tudor Revival house built  in 1909–10, a convent (1895–96), and school (1890–91).

The complex was added to the National Register of Historic Places in 1983.

In 2009 the church's school closed, and students were allowed to transfer to the nearby regional school.

See also
National Register of Historic Places listings in Pawtucket, Rhode Island

References

External links
Official site of the Holy See
St. Mary's web site

Roman Catholic churches completed in 1830
19th-century Roman Catholic church buildings in the United States
Churches in the Roman Catholic Diocese of Providence
Churches on the National Register of Historic Places in Rhode Island
1830 establishments in Rhode Island
Buildings and structures in Pawtucket, Rhode Island
Churches in Providence County, Rhode Island
National Register of Historic Places in Pawtucket, Rhode Island